Åsa Karin Sandlund (born 11 May 1979 in Linköping, Östergötland) is a former freestyle swimmer from Sweden, who competed for her native country at the 1996 Summer Olympics in Atlanta, Georgia. There she was a member of the women's 4×200 m freestyle relay team that ended up in ninth place, teaming up with Louise Jöhncke, Josefin Lillhage, and Johanna Sjöberg.

Clubs
Linköpings Allmänna SS

External links
 
 

1979 births
Living people
Swimmers at the 1996 Summer Olympics
Olympic swimmers of Sweden
Sportspeople from Linköping
Linköpings ASS swimmers
Swedish female freestyle swimmers
Sportspeople from Östergötland County
20th-century Swedish women